Adelitas Way is the debut album by Adelitas Way, released on July 14, 2009. It is the first and only album to feature guitarist Chris Iorio before leaving the band a few months after the album was released. A limited edition autographed booklet was included when you pre-ordered the album on www.newburycomics.com. The album has sold over 200,000 copies, and over 1 million singles.

Album cover
According to guitarist Chris Iorio, the album cover is an interpretation of when Rick DeJesus met a young woman who worked in a brothel, when he went to Tijuana, Mexico – "Rick met the girl and she poured her heart out to him and it really touched him...people’s lives can be so tough – we’re in a recession, North Korea is talking about going to war with us, Mexico just had the swine flu and the album cover is an interpretation of times in our lives when things might look bad but knowing that you can always overcome your biggest obstacles."

Track listing

Personnel
Rick DeJesus – lead vocals
Chris Iorio – lead guitar
Keith Wallen – rhythm guitar, backing vocals
Derek Johnston – bass guitar
Trevor "Tre" Stafford – drums, percussion
Mike Watts – mixing

References

2009 debut albums
Adelitas Way albums
Virgin Records albums
Albums produced by Johnny K